The Whispering Willow Wind Farm – East in Franklin County, Iowa, USA, has a capacity of 200 megawatts (MW) and was completed in 2009. Construction of the wind farm began in 2008.

See also

List of onshore wind farms

References

Energy infrastructure completed in 2008
Buildings and structures in Franklin County, Iowa
Wind farms in Iowa